Eduardo Daniel Aguirre Lara (born 3 August 1998), also known as El Mudo, is a Mexican professional footballer who plays as a forward for Liga MX club Santos Laguna.

Aguirre represented Mexico in various youth levels, especially at the 2018 Toulon Tournament, representing the Mexico U21 team, where he was the top scorer with 7 goals.

Club career
Aguirre started his youth career at Santos Laguna in 2013 and broke into the senior team in 2017. He subsequently joined Tampico Madero on loan in 2017, where he would have his senior debut against Zacatepec on 22 July 2017, finishing with a 0–0 draw. On 14 February 2018, he would score his first senior goal against Universidad de Guadalajara in a 4–2 victory.

On 16 February 2020, Aguirre scored his first goal against Tigres UANL in a 2–1 victory, managing to score both goals for his team.

International career

Youth
He was part of the roster that participated in the 2015 FIFA U-17 World Cup in Chile. In the round-of-16 match against Chile, he would score Mexico's third goal at the 69th minute where the team won 4–1.

He was called up for the 2017 FIFA U-20 World Cup.

He was part of the roster that participated at the 2018 Toulon Tournament.
He was the top scorer of the tournament with 7 goals.

He was also part of the roster that participated at the 2018 Central American and Caribbean Games. He would score Mexico's 2 goals in the entire tournament, scoring a penalty in their 2–1 loss against Venezuela and giving Mexico the lead against Haiti but eventually tying 1–1, ending up as last in Group B with 1 point.

In May 2019, Aguirre was called up by Jaime Lozano to participate in that year's Toulon Tournament, where Mexico finished third in the tournament.

Ruled out for the 2020 CONCACAF Men's Olympic Qualifying Championship as it was not a FIFA-sanctioned tournament, Aguirre was called up to participate in the 2020 Summer Olympics. He won the bronze medal with the Olympic team.

Senior
Aguirre received his first call-up to the senior national team by Gerardo Martino, and made his debut on 27 October 2021 in a friendly match against Ecuador, coming in as a substitute in the 65th minute for Santiago Giménez.

Career statistics

Club

International

Honours
Mexico Youth
CONCACAF U-17 Championship: 2015
Olympic Bronze Medal: 2020

Individual
Toulon Tournament Golden Boot: 2018
Toulon Tournament Best XI: 2018

References

External links

1998 births
Living people
Footballers from Coahuila
Mexican footballers
Association football forwards
Santos Laguna footballers
Tampico Madero F.C. footballers
Liga MX players
Mexico youth international footballers
Mexico under-20 international footballers
Mexico international footballers
People from San Pedro, Coahuila
Olympic footballers of Mexico
Footballers at the 2020 Summer Olympics
Olympic medalists in football
Olympic bronze medalists for Mexico
Medalists at the 2020 Summer Olympics